Gail Buckner was a Democratic member of the Georgia State Senate, representing its 44th District from 2009 to 2011. She was formerly a Georgia State Assembly representative of district 76, encompassing parts of Clayton County  from 1990 to 2006. Buckner represented district 76. Buckner was a candidate for Secretary of State of Georgia  in 2006, but lost to Republican Karen Handel.

Education
Buckner received her Bachelor of Science Degree from Clayton State University in Education and later attended Georgia State University for her Communications major.

Organizations
President of the Public Relations Student Society of America (PRSSA)
President of the National Federation of Democratic Women
Graduated from the National Foundation for Women Legislators' Leadership College.

Family
Gail is married to her husband Charles Buckner and they have been married for 41 years. Together they have three children who were educated in the public schools of the Clayton County School System. They are now successful adults with children of their own.

References

Living people
Clayton State University alumni
Members of the Georgia House of Representatives
Women state legislators in Georgia (U.S. state)
21st-century American politicians
21st-century American women politicians
Year of birth missing (living people)